Karen Sharp (30 September 1971, Ipswich) is a musician who plays tenor saxophone, baritone saxophone and clarinet. She is best known for her former membership of Humphrey Lyttelton's eight-piece jazz band.

She has released four albums under her own name – Till There Was You in 2002, So Far So Good in 2004,  Wait And See in 2007 and Spirit in 2011.

Literature 
 John Chilton: Who’s Who of British Jazz. Continuum, London 2004, .

References

External links
Karen Sharp official site
Calligraph Records

Living people
British jazz saxophonists
British jazz clarinetists
21st-century saxophonists
21st-century clarinetists
21st-century women musicians
Women jazz saxophonists
Women clarinetists
1971 births